Mariinsky District is an administrative district (raion), one of the nineteen in Kemerovo Oblast, Russia. As a municipal division, it is incorporated as Mariinsky Municipal District. It is located in the north of the oblast. Its administrative center is the town of Mariinsk (which is not administratively a part of the district). Population:  19,182 (2002 Census);

Administrative and municipal status
Within the framework of administrative divisions, Mariinsky District is one of the nineteen in the oblast. The town of Mariinsk serves as its administrative center, despite being incorporated separately as a town under oblast jurisdiction—an administrative unit with the status equal to that of the districts.

As a municipal division, the district is incorporated as Mariinsky Municipal District, with Mariinsk Town Under Oblast Jurisdiction being incorporated within it as Mariinskoye Urban Settlement.

References

Notes

Sources

Districts of Kemerovo Oblast
